The sixth generation (Generation VI) of the Pokémon franchise features 72 fictional species of creatures introduced to the core video game series in the 2013 Nintendo 3DS games Pokémon X and Y. Some Pokémon in this generation were introduced in animated adaptations of the franchise before X and Y. This generation featured the series' largest graphical overhaul: a shift from two-dimensional sprites to three-dimensional polygons. A new type (Fairy) was introduced for the first time since Gold and Silver in 1999, bringing the total to 18. Greater emphasis was placed on making Pokémon species more unique and in-tune with the culture and fauna of Europe, namely France.

All Pokémon were created by a team of roughly 20 artists, led by Ken Sugimori and Hironobu Yoshida. For the first time in the franchise, the generation's legendary Pokémon—specifically Xerneas and Yveltal—were not designed by Sugimori alone; he requested the help of Atsuko Nishida to move their designs forward.

The following list details the 72 Pokémon of Generation VI in order of their National Pokédex number. The first Pokémon, Chespin, is number 650 and the last, Volcanion, is number 721. Alternate forms that result in type changes and Mega evolutions are included for convenience.

Design and development
Development of Pokémon X and Y began in 2010 and the games were released worldwide on October 12, 2013. Director Junichi Masuda revealed the three main themes of Pokémon X and Y to be beauty, bonds and evolution. Beauty was the core focus and Masuda felt France to be a prime example of such; he brought a team to the country for study in 2011. With the games taking place in a region based on France (called Kalos), design inspiration stemmed more from European culture (e.g. the legendary trio of Xerneas, Yveltal and Zygarde have their roots in Norse mythology). More focus than usual was placed on giving new Pokémon unique elements for this generation.

A major design change for the franchise was the shift from two-dimensional sprites to three-dimensional polygons. This required a larger development team than past games, with more than 500 people involved with the games' development, inclusive of localization teams. Emphasis was placed on retaining the iconic style of Pokémon art director Ken Sugimori who has been designing Pokémon and creating the franchise's official artwork since Red and Green in 1996. A new type was also added into the game for the first time since Gold and Silver in 1999: Fairy type. This type was introduced to balance out the Dragon, Fighting, Poison, and Steel types. Dragon was previously only weak against itself and Ice, and only resisted against Steel. Fighting previously was super-effective against five different types (Normal, Ice, Rock, Dark and Steel) and only weak against Flying and Psychic types. Poison was previously only super-effective against Grass, resisted against itself, Rock, Ground and Ghost types and ineffective against Steel. Steel previously was only super-effective against Ice and Rock types and resisted against itself, Fire, Water and Electric types. Aside from this, Ghost and Dark are now neutral against Steel, improving the offensive usefulness of both types. Multiple Pokémon from previous generations, such as Jigglypuff, Gardevoir and Marill, were retroactively assigned the new type while 13 new Pokémon, most notably Sylveon, donned the type. A new mechanic called Mega Evolution—a temporary form change akin to normal evolution—was also added for more dynamic battles and stemmed from the concepts of bonds and evolution. Mega Evolutions "refined designs to a new extreme" according to Yoshida and required considerable effort. They were made temporary to retain balance in battles and only made possible when a Pokémon is holding their respective Mega Stone to prevent players from giving them a different advantageous hold item. The only Pokémon from Generation VI capable of Mega Evolution is Diancie. A variant of Mega Evolution called "Primal Reversion" was introduced in Omega Ruby and Alpha Sapphire; this mechanic is exclusive to the legendary Pokémon Groudon and Kyogre.

The titles X and Y, representing the x-axis and y-axis—also reflecting different forms of thinking—were chosen early in development. The simplicity of the names was also related to the simultaneous worldwide release of the games. Designers additionally sought to make the Pokémon names the same in every country whenever possible. Masuda expressed that this effort proved exceptionally difficult as the names have to feel fitting to their physical appearance and not infringe upon any rights. At the request of Masuda, the shapes "X" and "Y" were used as the framework for the boxart legendary Pokémon: Xerneas and Yveltal. Normally, Sugimori designs the legendary Pokémon by himself; however, he required assistance from designer Atsuko Nishida to create Xerneas and Yveltal. Finalization of their designs took about 18 months, 3 times longer than normal. Manga artist Hitoshi Ariga was requested to assist in creating Pokémon for X and Y; Ariga ultimately designed ten species for the games. It is speculated by fans that the designs for the Chespin, Fennekin and Froakie evolutionary lines stem from typical role-playing game character classes, such as those in Final Fantasy. Chespin represents the knight, paladin and fighter classes; Fennekin represents the witch, mage and magician classes; and Froakie represents the ninja, thief and rogue classes.

List of Pokémon

 Chespin
 Quilladin
 Chesnaught
 Fennekin
 Braixen
 Delphox
 Froakie
 Frogadier
 Greninja
 Bunnelby
 Diggersby
 Fletchling
 Fletchinder
 Talonflame
 Scatterbug
 Spewpa
 Vivillon
 Litleo
 Pyroar
 Flabébé
 Floette
 Florges
 Skiddo
 Gogoat
 Pancham
 Pangoro
 Furfrou
 Espurr
 Meowstic
 Honedge
 Doublade
 Aegislash
 Spritzee
 Aromatisse
 Swirlix
 Slurpuff
 Inkay
 Malamar
 Binacle
 Barbaracle
 Skrelp
 Dragalge
 Clauncher
 Clawitzer
 Helioptile
 Heliolisk
 Tyrunt
 Tyrantrum
 Amaura
 Aurorus
 Sylveon
 Hawlucha
 Dedenne
 Carbink
 Goomy
 Sliggoo
 Goodra
  Klefki
 Phantump
 Trevenant
 Pumpkaboo
 Gourgeist
 Bergmite
 Avalugg
 Noibat
 Noivern
 Xerneas
 Yveltal
 Zygarde
 Diancie
 Hoopa
 Volcanion

Mega-Evolved Forms

 Venusaur
 Charizard
 Charizard X
 Charizard Y
 Blastoise
 Beedrill
 Pidgeot
 Alakazam
 Slowbro
 Gengar
 Kangaskhan
 Pinsir
 Gyarados
 Aerodactyl
 Mewtwo
 Mewtwo X
 Mewtwo Y
 Ampharos
 Steelix
 Scizor
 Heracross
 Houndoom
 Tyranitar
 Sceptile
 Blaziken
 Swampert
 Gardevoir
 Sableye
 Mawile
 Aggron
 Medicham
 Manectric
 Sharpedo
 Camerupt
 Altaria
 Banette
 Absol
 Glalie
 Salamence
 Metagross
 Latias
 Latios
 Rayquaza
 Lopunny
 Garchomp
 Lucario
 Abomasnow
 Gallade
 Audino
 Diancie

Primal Forms

 Kyogre
 Groudon

Notes

References

Lists of Pokémon
Video game characters introduced in 2013